Jessica Palmer is a New Zealand academic lawyer,  as of 2019 is a full professor and dean of law at the University of Otago.

Academic career
After an undergraduate degree at the University of Auckland Palmer completed LLM's at the University of Cambridge and the University of Auckland, before rising to professor and dean of law at the University of Otago, replacing Mark Henaghan.

Awards
In 2004, Palmer received the Ethel Benjamin Prize.

Selected works
 Law and Policy in Modern Family Finance: Property Division in the 21st Century 
 Civil Remedies in New Zealand – 2nd edition

References

Living people
1980 births
New Zealand women academics
21st-century New Zealand lawyers
New Zealand women lawyers
University of Auckland alumni
Alumni of the University of Cambridge
Academic staff of the University of Otago